, which is known outside of Japan as Global Champion, is a 1994 fighting game released for the arcades by Taito. Kaiser Knuckle was released during the fighting game trend of the 1990s that began with Capcom's Street Fighter II. It is planned to be included as part of the Taito Egret II mini console, marking its first re-release outside arcades.

Gameplay

Kaiser Knuckle follows the fighting game conventions established by Street Fighter II, in which the player's character fights against opponents in a best two-out-of-three match round format from within a single player tournament mode, either with the computer or against another human player in versus mode. The player has a character roster of nine initially selectable fighters to choose from and three unplayable computer-controlled bosses, each with their own unique fighting style and special techniques. The control layout is set to the six-button standard (as with most Capcom fighting games), but it can be switched to a five-button layout via dip settings.

Another unique feature is that it introduced the power zones, which can be utilized via a successful hit of a special move when a player's "Crush Meter" is full. The power zones (either fire or electric) can also affect a certain special move that a character has. Backgrounds can be destructible when players get hit to charge up, and when those meters are full, the next special move that a player connects with an opponent will destroy the background's properties at will (other parts of stages, such as floors and walls are also destructible).

Characters

There are nine playable characters, and three unplayable bosses.
 – The main protagonist of the game, who is a karateka from Japan. Kazuya seeks to win the tournament so that he can not only gain the prize money, but also to impress some women as well. (voice actor: Kazuki Yao)
 – A swordswoman from Taiwan. Lihua seeks to win the tournament in the hopes of locating her missing mother and father. (voice actor: Saeko Shimazu)
 – A mixed martial artist and biker from the USA. Barts is determined to win the tournament's prize money so that he can help fund a medical operation for his girlfriend Sarah, who was injured in a past motorcycle accident. (voice actor: Ryōtarō Okiayu)
 – A Chinese martial artist and detective, he has black scratch marks on his cheeks. Wulong enters the tournament so that he can attempt to win the prize money and use it to pay a debt to a Chinese criminal group that he knows very well. (voice actor: Yasushi Horibata)
 – An Amazon and a jungle girl from Brazil, accompanied by a monkey and a green cockatoo. Liza heads to the tournament in the hopes of winning the prize money so that she can buy a new exotic costume for the Rio Carnival. (voice actor: Aya Hisakawa)
 – An African-American breakdancer from the USA. Boggy is determined to win the tournament so that he can advance his own dancing career. (voice actor: Andrew Holms)
 – A ninja from Japan. Gekkou seeks to win the tournament so that he can gain the secrets of his ninjutsu style from his master. (voice actor: Hideo Ishikawa)
 – A boxer from USA. McCoy seeks to win the tournament so that he can use the prize money to help gain him a title shot against the current boxing heavyweight champion. (voice actor: Kazunari Tanaka)
 – A mutated human from Germany, his face is wrapped in bandages so only his eyeball is visible, his clothes including his shoes are ragged and worn out. Marco heads to the tournament in the hopes of winning the prize money so that he can help fund a science research that could enable him to become a normal human. (voice actor: Hisayoshi Ogura)

Bosses
 – A judoka from Russia, he is often seen wearing a karate suit and a coonskin cap. Gonzales participates in the tournament so that he can attempt to locate his missing fiancée Tanya, who was separated from him after a civil war in their hometown. (voice actor: Hisao Egawa)
 – An Aztec warrior from Mexico. Azteca participates in the tournament so that he can attempt to regain his own lost memories. (voice actor: Ryu Kuzu)
 – The main antagonist and final boss of the game, who is the commander of a space station in orbit. General is the sponsor of "The Kaiser Knuckle" tournament, but his reasons for holding the competition in the first place is shrouded in mystery. (voice actor: Steve Yamashita)

Other
Announcer (voice actor: Randy Sexton)

Other versions

Global Champion
Global Champion is a modified USA version of Kaiser Knuckle, the Japanese and European versions. Global Champion has the "Recycle It, Don't Trash It!" screen, the "super moves" were cut, and the portraits of Kazuya, Liza and Lihua were re-drawn. After players choose their characters and their first opponents, they will then be able to see an intro sequence that shows the prologue of their chosen character's own personal story. The title screen is also different as well, but strangely, the letter "K" from both words in the Kaiser Knuckle logo can still be seen in some of Global Champions backgrounds.

Dan-Ku-Ga
This version allows the first two bosses, Gonzales and Azteca, to become playable characters. Players can no longer choose their first opponent in a one-player game, except on the Training difficulty level.

Other differences are the CPU AI being altered; players choose the difficulty level (Normal, Professional or Training) before their game; players can backdash with all characters; Gonzales becomes the 5th opponent, Azteca becomes the 9th and the doppelgänger of the selected character becomes the 10th; Kazuya, Lihua and Liza have been redesigned on the character select screen; all characters each have a third costume color; some of the basic attacks that are executed with two punch or kick buttons were taken out, but the rest are still present, being executed with a single button plus a joystick direction; finally, the third boss, General, can now be fought against without meeting certain conditions.

Additionally,  was also planned as a sequel to the original arcade board, intending to make the full transition to 3D, but the planning board itself was later canceled. The entire project would soon be retitled as Psychic Force, replacing the old models with new ones.

 Reception 
Game Machine also listed Kaiser Knuckle on their October 15, 1994 issue as being the twelfth most-successful table arcade unit of the month. Retrospective reception of the game focused on the game's final boss, General, who is considered as the hardest boss character in all of fighting games.

References

External linksKaiser KnuckleKaiser Knuckle at The Large Cult Fighting Game March 
Kaiser Knuckle at arcade-historyGlobal Champion / Dan-Ku-Ga'''
Global Champion at arcade-historyDan-Ku-Ga at arcade-history
Dan-Ku-Ga at The Large Cult Fighting Game March 

1994 video games
Arcade video games
Arcade-only video games
Multiplayer video games
Fighting games
Video games set in the United States
Video games set in Brazil
Video games set in Japan
Video games set in China
Video games set in Germany
Video games set in Taiwan
Video games set in Russia
Video games set in Mexico
Video games set in outer space
Video games scored by Yasuhisa Watanabe
Taito arcade games
Taito F3 System games
Video games developed in Japan